Events from the year 1636 in Sweden

Incumbents
 Monarch – Christina

Events

 Posten AB
 Axel Oxenstierna return to Sweden. 
 Battle of Wittstock
 All cities north of Stockholm and Åbo are prohibited from foreign trade.
 Establishment of the Nya smedjegården.

Births

Deaths

 February 3 – Petrus Kenicius, archbishop (born 1555) 
 Euphrosina Heldina von Dieffenau, royal governess and courtier (born unknown year)
 Johannes Messenius,  historian, dramatist and university professor (born 1579)

References

 
Years of the 17th century in Sweden
Sweden